Calliophis melanurus, commonly known as the slender coral snake, is a species of venomous elapid snake endemic to the Indian subcontinent. Two subspecies are recognized, including the nominotypical subspecies.

Geographic range
It is found in India, Bangladesh, and Sri Lanka.

The subspecies Calliophis melanurus sinhaleyus is found in Sri Lanka.

References

Further reading
 Boulenger, George A. (1890). The Fauna of British India, Including Ceylon and Burma. Reptilia and Batrachia. London: Secretary of State for India in Council. (Taylor and Francis, printers). xviii + 541 pp. ("Callophis [sic] trimaculatus", p. 384).
 Deraniyagala, P.E.P. (1951). "Some New Races of the Snakes Eryx, Callophis [sic] and Echis ". Spolia Zeylanica 26:(2) 147–150. ("Callophis [sic] melanurus sinhaleyus ssp. nov.", p. 148). 
 Slowinski, Joseph B.; Boundy, Jeff; and Lawson, R. (2001). "The phylogenetic relationships of Asian coral snakes (Elapidae: Calliophis and Maticora) based on morphological and molecular characters". Herpetologica 57 (2): 233–245.
 Smith MA (1943). The Fauna of British India, Ceylon and Burma, Including the Whole of the Indo-Chinese Sub-region. Reptilia and Amphibia. Vol. III.—Serpentes. London: Secretary of State for India. (Taylor and Francis, printers). xii + 583 pp. (Callophis [sic] melanurus, p. 420).
 Wall F (1921). Ophidia Taprobanica or the Snakes of Ceylon. Colombo, Ceylon [Sri Lanka]: Colombo Museum. (H.R. Cottle, Government Printer). xxii + 581 pp. (Callophis [sic] trimaculatus, pp. 497–501, Figure 90).

External links
 Photo

melanurus
Snakes of Asia
Reptiles of Bangladesh
Snakes of India
Reptiles of Sri Lanka
Taxa named by George Shaw
Reptiles described in 1802